John Alexander Cruickshank VC (born 20 May 1920) is a Scottish former banker, former Royal Air Force officer, and a Second World War recipient of the Victoria Cross (VC), the highest award for gallantry in the face of the enemy that can be awarded to British and Commonwealth forces. Cruickshank was awarded the VC for sinking a German U-boat and then, despite serious injuries, safely landing his aircraft. He is the last living recipient to have been awarded the VC during the Second World War.

Early life
Born on 20 May 1920 in Aberdeen, Scotland, Cruickshank was educated at the Royal High School, Edinburgh, Aberdeen Grammar School and Daniel Stewart's College. He was apprenticed to the Commercial Bank in Edinburgh.

Military service
Within a year, on his father's suggestion, he joined the Territorial Army, enlisting in the Royal Artillery in May 1939; he served there until the summer of 1941 when he transferred to the Royal Air Force Volunteer Reserve. He underwent flight training in Canada and the United States, earning his wings in July 1942. After further training, he was assigned to No. 210 Squadron in March 1943, piloting Consolidated PBY Catalina flying boats, flying from RAF Sullom Voe in Shetland.

Sullom Voe, now known for its oil terminal, was a flying-boat base during the Second World War. It was used by 210 Squadron of RAF Coastal Command in its battle to keep the North Atlantic and Arctic sea lanes open for supply convoys. Flying Officer Cruickshank was twenty-four years old when he piloted a Consolidated Catalina anti-submarine flying boat from Sullom Voe on 17 July 1944 on a patrol north into the Norwegian Sea. The objective was to protect the British Home Fleet as it returned from the unsuccessful Operation Mascot raid on the German battleship Tirpitz. There the "Cat" caught a German Type VIIC U-boat on the surface.

At this point in the war U-boats had been fitted with anti-aircraft guns as an attempt to counter the aerial threat. Cruickshank attacked the U-boat, flying his Catalina through a hail of flak. His first pass was unsuccessful, as his depth charges did not release. He brought the aircraft around for a second pass, this time straddling the U-boat and sinking it. All 52 crew members were lost. The U-boat was thought to be U-347, as Cruickshank's VC citation states, but the boat was actually U-361.

The German anti-aircraft fire had been deadly accurate, killing the navigator and injuring four others, including both Cruickshank and less seriously wounded second pilot Flight Sergeant Jack Garnett. Cruickshank was hit in seventy-two places, with two serious wounds to his lungs and ten penetrating wounds to his lower limbs. Despite this, he refused medical attention until he was sure that the appropriate radio signals had been sent and the aircraft was on course for its home base. Even then, he refused morphine, aware that it would cloud his judgement. Flying through the night, it took the damaged Catalina five and a half hours to return to Sullom Voe, with Garnett at the controls and Cruickshank lapsing in and out of consciousness in the back. Cruickshank then returned to the cockpit and took command of the aircraft again. Deciding that the light and the sea conditions for a water landing were too risky for the inexperienced Garnett to put the aircraft down safely, he kept the flying boat in the air circling for an extra hour until he considered it safer, when they landed the Catalina on the water and taxied to an area where it could be safely beached.

When the RAF medical officer boarded the aircraft, he discovered Cruickshank had lost a great deal of blood, and had to give him a transfusion before he was stable enough to be transferred to hospital.  John Cruickshank's injuries were such that he never flew in command of an aircraft again. For his actions in sinking the U-boat and saving his crew he received the Victoria Cross while Flight Sergeant Jack Garnett received the Distinguished Flying Medal.

Victoria Cross citation
The announcement and accompanying citation for the decoration was published in a supplement to The London Gazette on 1 September 1944, reading

Later life
Cruickshank left the RAF in September 1946 to return to his career in banking; he retired from this in 1977. In March 2004 the Queen unveiled the first national monument to Coastal Command at Westminster Abbey, London. Cruickshank said in an interview after the ceremony: "When they told me that I was to get the VC it was unbelievable. Decorations didn't enter my head." Four VCs were awarded to Coastal Command in the war; the others were posthumous.

He is vice chairman of The Victoria Cross and George Cross Association along with Rambahadur Limbu. He celebrated his 100th birthday on 20 May 2020. He became the first recipient of the Victoria Cross to reach the age of 100, and the second member of the VC and GC Association after Stuart Archer, a George Cross recipient.

Awards

(ribbon bar, as it would look today)

Victoria Cross
1939-1945 Star
Atlantic Star
Arctic Star
Defence Medal
War Medal 1939-1945
Queen Elizabeth II Coronation Medal (1953)
Queen Elizabeth II Silver Jubilee Medal (1977)
Queen Elizabeth II Golden Jubilee Medal (2002)
Queen Elizabeth II Diamond Jubilee Medal (2012)
Queen Elizabeth II Platinum Jubilee Medal (2022)
Efficiency Medal

Since the King George VI Coronation Medal in 1937, living Victoria Cross and George Cross recipients are automatically eligible for any coronation and jubilee medals that are given following their being awarded the Victoria Cross or the George Cross.

References
Specific

General
British VCs of World War 2 (John Laffin, 1997)
Monuments to Courage (David Harvey, 1999)
The Register of the Victoria Cross (This England, 1997)
Scotland's Forgotten Valour (Graham Ross, 1995)
Symbol of Courage:A History of the Victoria Cross (Max Arthur, 2004)
For Valour: The Air VCs (Chaz Bowyer, 1992)

External links
U-361 (details on the U-boat from this action)

1920 births
Living people
British World War II bomber pilots
British World War II recipients of the Victoria Cross
Men centenarians
People educated at Aberdeen Grammar School
People educated at Stewart's Melville College
People educated at the Royal High School, Edinburgh
Military personnel from Aberdeen
Royal Air Force officers
Royal Air Force pilots of World War II
Royal Air Force recipients of the Victoria Cross
Royal Air Force Volunteer Reserve personnel of World War II
Royal Artillery officers
Scottish airmen
Scottish bankers
Scottish centenarians
British Army personnel of World War II